Handleyomys alfaroi, also known as Alfaro's rice rat or Alfaro's oryzomys, is a species of rodent in the genus Handleyomys of family Cricetidae. It is found in Belize, Colombia, Costa Rica, Ecuador, El Salvador, Guatemala, Honduras, Mexico, Nicaragua, and Panama. It was previously included in Oryzomys as Oryzomys alfaroi. Its natural habitats are subtropical and tropical lowland or montane dry forests at elevations ranging from sea level to 2500 m.

References

Literature cited
Musser, G. G. and M. D. Carleton. 2005. Superfamily Muroidea. pp. 894–1531 in Mammal Species of the World a Taxonomic and Geographic Reference. D. E. Wilson and D. M. Reeder eds. Johns Hopkins University Press, Baltimore.

 

Handleyomys
Mammals of Central America
Mammals of Colombia
Mammals of Ecuador
Mammals of Mexico
Mammals described in 1891
Taxonomy articles created by Polbot